Tripartite motif-containing 22, also known as TRIM22, is a protein which in humans is encoded by the TRIM22 gene.

Function 

The protein encoded by this gene is a member of the tripartite motif (TRIM) family. The TRIM motif includes three zinc-binding domains, a RING, a B-box type 1 and a B-box type 2, and a coiled-coil region. This protein localizes to the cytoplasm and its expression is induced by interferon. TRIM22 is also a target gene of the  tumor suppressor protein p53.

TRIM22 possesses E3 ubiquitin ligase activity and is able to ubiquitinate itself with the assistance of the E2 enzyme UbcH5B.  Furthermore, TRIM22 is located in the nucleus and therefore may function as a nuclear E3 ubiquitin ligase.

Clinical significance 

The protein down-regulates transcription from the HIV-1 long terminal repeat promoter region, suggesting that function of this protein may be to mediate interferon's antiviral effects. Other proteins that function to restrict HIV replication include TRIM5alpha and APOBEC3G.

It has been demonstrated that treatment of cells with interferon type I inhibits HIV replication and TRIM22 is strongly up-regulated by interferon treatment.  Furthermore, HIV particle release from cells depleted of TRIM22 with RNA interference is enhanced. TRIM22 appears to prevent the movement of the HIV Gag protein to the plasma membrane and hence TRIM22 can block HIV replication in cell cultures by preventing the assembly of the virus.

References

External links